A catsuit is a one-piece form-fitting garment that covers the torso and the legs, and frequently the arms. They are usually made from stretchable material, such as lycra, chiffon, spandex (after 1959), latex, or velour, but may use less elastic materials, such as leather or PVC. Catsuits frequently close by means of a zipper at the front or back. A catsuit is regarded as outerwear, but not normally street wear. Catsuits are also used for sexualization or other types of sexuality.

History and use

Catsuits were occasionally worn as a fashion item at various times from the 1960s to the 1990s. During the 1970s and 1980s, they were worn for aerobics and disco dancing. Around 1980, disco dance catsuits briefly became a street fashion item in the United Kingdom.

Athletes in sports such as speed skating, bobsled, winter triathlon, ski-racing, cycling, bodyflight and gymnastics wear garments similar to catsuits, called unitards, which are specifically geared to the needs of the sport involved. Also similar in appearance are wetsuits and drysuits used by scuba divers, and the speedsuits used by competitive swimmers before the more extreme forms of the suit were banned. Also, in tennis Serena Williams would sometimes wear catsuits, two examples are the 2002 US Open and the 2018 French Open.

The name "catsuit" is attributed only since about 1955 or 1960. Originally, they were called bodysuits. The origin of the name is unknown; it may refer to a slinky, catlike aspect given the wearer by some versions. It may also relate to the association with antiheroine Catwoman whose costume from the 1950's onward is a modified catsuit.

In popular culture

The catsuit is often worn in movies, television, music videos, and computer games.

 In comics and their movie adaptations, catsuits are often worn by superheroes and supervillains, including the iconic Catwoman; other examples include Batgirl and Black Panther.
 Scarlett Johansson wears a catsuit portraying Natasha Romanoff-Black Widow in several films, beginning with Iron Man 2 (2010). 
 The lead female characters of the Underworld film series and The Matrix wore catsuits.
 Female villains and heroines in spy films may wear catsuits, such as the Baroness and Scarlett in G.I. Joe: The Rise of Cobra.
 An iconic use of catsuits in popular media was on the British television show The Avengers, where Cathy Gale (Honor Blackman) and Emma Peel (Diana Rigg) wore tight leather catsuits; leather was chosen because it lit well in studio lighting and did not split during action scenes.
 Shirley Bassey wore a sleeveless chiffon catsuit for a gatefold album photograph, and in concert.
 Cher has worn catsuits in concert.
 In popular culture, catsuits have become the stereotypical costume of dominatrixes.
 Lara Croft, heroine of the Tomb Raider franchise, has worn catsuits in specific segments in Tomb Raider 3 and Tomb Raider Chronicles.
 In the Star Trek: Enterprise TV series, the Vulcan commander T'Pol (portrayed by Jolene Blalock) wore a uniform sometimes described as a catsuit.
 In the fighting game Persona 4 Arena and its enhanced port, Persona 4 Arena Ultimax, the character Mitsuru Kirijo wears a black catsuit under a big white fur coat.
 The music video of Liberty X's 2002 smash hit "Just a Little" features two of its members, Jessica Taylor and Kelli Young, wearing tight black latex catsuits. On occasions where the group has performed the song live on television, both Taylor and Young wear their catsuits from the original music video. In 2013, when the group performed during the Big Reunion, both members wore a different design of their catsuits.

See also

 Bodystocking
 Bodysuit
 Bondage suit
 Fetish fashion
 Jumpsuit
 Latex and PVC fetishism 
 Latex clothing 
 Leggings
 Leg warmers 
 Tights
 Long underwear
 PVC clothing
 Spandex fetishism
 Unitard
 Wetsuit
 Zentai

References

External links
 

20th-century fashion
21st-century fashion
Costume design
History of fashion
Fetish clothing
One-piece suits